Pennsylvania's 15th congressional district has been located in western and central Pennsylvania since 2019. Since 2023, the district includes all of Armstrong, Cameron, Centre, Clarion, Clearfield, Clinton, Elk, Forest, Jefferson, McKean, Potter, Snyder, Tioga, Union, and Warren counties, as well as parts of Indiana, Lycoming, and Venango counties.

From 2013 to 2019, the district stretched from the suburbs east of Harrisburg to communities east of Allentown and the New Jersey border. Counties located in the district included all of Lehigh County and parts of Berks County, Dauphin County, Lebanon County, and Northampton County.

From 2003 to 2013 it comprised all of Northampton County, most of Lehigh County, and small parts of Berks and Montgomery counties. The district included the Lehigh Valley, Indian Valley and Upper Perkiomen Valley regions. In the mid-20th century, it included Tioga County.

In its former boundaries, it had a slight Democratic tilt in registered voters due to the presence of fairly large cities such as Allentown and Bethlehem, with industrial histories. The Democrats in the Lehigh Valley are generally considered more moderate than their counterparts in the Philadelphia area, particularly on social issues. The district has elected Republican candidates for all but six years since 1979. During 1999–2005, Pat Toomey represented the district. From 2005 to 2018, fellow Republican Charlie Dent represented the district; in September 2017 he announced he would be retiring and not seek re-election in 2018. Democrat Susan Wild won the special election.

The Supreme Court of Pennsylvania redrew the district in February 2018 after ruling the previous map unconstitutional because it had gerrymandered too much on behalf of the Republican Party. In 2012 Democrats had won only five of the state’s 18 congressional districts, the year the previous redistricting by the legislature took effect, although they won the House statewide popular vote by 1.5 percentage points.

In the redistricting, the old 15th district had its boundaries compressed around Allentown and became the 7th district, while the old 5th district had its boundaries adjusted and became the 15th district for the 2018 election and representation thereafter. It has been represented by Glenn Thompson since January 3, 2019.

List of members representing the district

Recent elections

See also
List of United States congressional districts
Pennsylvania's congressional districts

References

 
 
 Congressional Biographical Directory of the United States 1774–present

External links
 Congressional redistricting in Pennsylvania

15
Government of Lehigh County, Pennsylvania
Government of Northampton County, Pennsylvania
Constituencies established in 1813
1813 establishments in Pennsylvania